Sutter Delta Medical Center is a 145-bed general medical/surgical hospital in Antioch, California. A Level II Trauma Center, Sutter Delta is a not-for-profit teaching hospital and is ranked as a High Performing hospital for COPD and heart failure. It is part of Sutter Health.

Originally founded as Antioch Hospital in 1927, it became Delta Memorial Hospital in the 1960s and joined Sutter Health in 1990. As of 2020, the CEO is Sherrie Hickman, who previously worked at Sutter Novato Community Hospital and in leadership roles at Kaiser Permanente and Dignity Health.

See also
 List of hospitals in California

References

Hospitals in Contra Costa County, California
Hospitals in the San Francisco Bay Area
Sutter Health